Maximilian William Kilman (born 23 May 1997) is an English professional footballer who plays as a defender for Premier League club Wolverhampton Wanderers.

Early life
Kilman was born in Chelsea, Greater London, to a Ukrainian father, an arts dealer, and a Ukrainian mother, who worked as a catwalk model. His father was from Odesa, and his mother is from Kyiv. Kilman speaks Russian in addition to English.

Club career

Early career
Kilman began his career in the academy at Fulham. As a teenager, he joined futsal club Genesis Futsal Club while continuing to play the 11-a-side game. He later joined the academy at Gillingham before signing for Maidenhead United in 2015, after making a single London Senior Cup appearance for Welling United against Cockfosters in October 2014. Kilman was loaned out to Southern Football League side Marlow for the 2016–17 season.

Kilman returned the following season and made his debut for the Magpies on the opening day of the 2017–18 season against Maidstone United, while continuing his futsal career, signing for Helvécia. He went on to make 39 appearances for Maidenhead before signing for Wolverhampton Wanderers for an undisclosed fee on transfer deadline day in August 2018.

Wolverhampton Wanderers
Kilman spent the season with the club's under-23 side, helping them to win promotion from the second tier of the Premier League reserve competition. In April 2019, head coach Nuno Espírito Santo stated that "Max is 100 per cent integrated into the (first team) squad... I just see him as a very good football player, a centre-half with quality. He's big, aggressive. He has to improve like all young players, but we're really, really happy with Max." Kilman was first included in a senior matchday squad in December 2018, and was an unused substitute on five occasions before he made his senior debut on 4 May 2019, coming on as a last-minute substitute in a 1–0 win against Fulham in the Premier League. In doing so, he became the first player to go directly from non-League to the Premier League, with no loans in between, since Chris Smalling moved from Maidstone United to Fulham in 2008. Kilman made his full senior debut for Wolves in a 4–0 home win against FC Pyunik of Armenia in the 2019–20 UEFA Europa League Qualifying Third Round, 2nd Leg, on 15 August.

On 21 April 2020, Wolverhampton's Express & Star announced that Kilman's contract with Wolves had been extended until the summer of 2022. On 21 October, Wolves announced that Kilman had extended his contract with the club until the summer of 2025.

On 1 November 2021, Kilman scored the opening goal in Wolves's 2–1 win over Everton at Molineux. The goal, a well-taken header, following a corner from the left from Rayan Aït-Nouri, was Kilman's first for Wolves (in his 44th appearance for the club at senior level) and his first in the Premier League. Four days later, Kilman signed a new long-term deal with Wolves until 2026.

International career
Kilman made his debut for the England national futsal team at the age of 18. He went on to accumulate 25 caps for the Three Lions. Kilman's futsal career was put on hiatus when he signed for Wolves in August 2018. He was also eligible to play international football for Russia or Ukraine through his parents.

In March 2021, Ukraine coach Andriy Shevchenko announced that he had formally asked FIFA to switch Kilman's national allegiance to Ukraine, but also enquired of them as to whether his appearances for the England futsal team would make him ineligible for Ukraine. On 7 April 2021, FIFA rejected the application, confirming that his appearances for England in competitive futsal matches ties him to playing for England in any form of football.

Career statistics

References

External links

Profile at the Wolverhampton Wanderers F.C. website

1997 births
Living people
Footballers from Chelsea, London
English footballers
Association football defenders
Fulham F.C. players
Gillingham F.C. players
Welling United F.C. players
Maidenhead United F.C. players
Marlow F.C. players
Wolverhampton Wanderers F.C. players
Southern Football League players
National League (English football) players
Premier League players
English men's futsal players
Futsal defenders
English people of Ukrainian descent